Peter Gorny (born 20 April 1941) is a retired German rower. He competed for the United Team of Germany at the 1964 Summer Olympics in the coxed pairs and for East Germany at the 1968 Summer Olympics in eights and finished in seventh place on both occasions. Gorny also won a world title in the coxed pairs in 1970 and four medals at the European championships of 1964–1971, including two gold medals.

References

External links
 

1941 births
Living people
Olympic rowers of the United Team of Germany
Olympic rowers of East Germany
Rowers at the 1964 Summer Olympics
Rowers at the 1968 Summer Olympics
East German male rowers
World Rowing Championships medalists for East Germany
European Rowing Championships medalists